A New Wave of Violence is the debut album by the hardcore punk supergroup Head Wound City. It was released on May 13, 2016. It was their first release since 2005.

Track listing

References

2016 debut albums
Head Wound City albums
Vice Records albums